Chloris filiformis is a species of grass known to occur in Madagascar and Mauritius.

References

filiformis